Canberra Heat Volleyball Club (Men) is an Australian national league volleyball club based in Canberra, Australia. Canberra Heat Men have represented Australia at the Asian Men's Club Volleyball Championship.

Canberra Heat Men began life as the Canberra Cobras in 1998, then renamed to Canberra Chiefs in 1999 before becoming the Canberra Heat in 2002. Les Young is the head coach and has led the team to two national championships, four silver medals and two bronze medals in his eight years coaching the club.

Honours 
Australian Volleyball League
 Gold (2):  2011, 2015
 Silver (6): 1999, 2002, 2013, 2014, 2016, 2018
 Bronze (5): 1998, 2001, 2003, 2010, 2017

Asian Men's Club Volleyball Championship
 2017 Asian Men's Club Volleyball Championship (10th)
2018 Asian Men's Club Volleyball Championship (9th)

Asian Club Championship Rosters

Australian Volleyball League Rosters

Notable players 
 Ben Hardy  2011–2013
 Nicolás Uriarte  2004
 Dave Ferguson  2002–2004, 2012
 Russ Wentworth  2002–2003
 Travis Passier  2013–2016
 Steve Power 1998
 Dave Darcy  1998–2005, 2017–present
 Vlad Baltovski  2000–2002
 Sam Walker  2017
 Russell Borgeaud  2010–2013

Captains 
 1998  Steve Power
 1999  Mark Lebedew
 2000  Vlad Baltovski
 2001  Vlad Baltovski
 2002  Russ Wentworth
 2003  Jason Craig
 2004  Jason Craig
 2005  Phil Eagles
 2006  Chris Brooke
 2007  Doug Farrer
 2008  Doug Farrer
 2009  Doug Farrer
 2010  Brad Osborn
 2011  Brad Osborn
 2012  Simon Hone
 2013  Ben Hardy
 2014  Dan Tyrrell
 2015  Dan Tyrrell
 2016  Andre Borgeaud
 2017  Martin Collins
 2018  Jordan Power (Asian Club Champs)
 2018  Andre Borgeaud
 2019  Andre Borgeaud

Coaches 
 1998  Steve Power
 1999  Mark Lebedew
 2000    
 2001   
 2002  Greg Tompos
 2003  Greg Tompos
 2004  Dan Ilott
 2005  Alexis Lebedew
 2006  Neil Boyes
 2007  Neil Boyes
 2008  Neil Boyes / Nic Kaiser / Les Young
 2009  Neil Boyes
 2010  Les Young
 2011  Les Young
 2012  Ben Hardy
 2013  Les Young
 2014  Les Young
 2015  Les Young
 2016  Les Young
 2017  Les Young
 2018  Les Young
 2019  Les Young

References 

Australian volleyball clubs
1998 establishments in Australia
Volleyball clubs established in 1998
Heat